The 1997 World Table Tennis Championships were held in Manchester from April 24 to May 5, 1997. This event was notable as the winner Jan-Ove Waldner won without losing a single set in all matches played, this was the first time that this occurred.

Results

Team

Individual

References

External links
ITTF Museum

 
World Table Tennis Championships
World Table Tennis Championships
World Table Tennis Championships
Table tennis competitions in the United Kingdom
International sports competitions in Manchester
World Table Tennis Championships, 1997
World Table Tennis Championships
World Table Tennis Championships